Control+C is a common computer command. It is generated by pressing the  key while holding down the  key on most computer keyboards.

In graphical user interface environments that use the control key to control the active program, control+C is often used to copy highlighted text to the clipboard. 

In many command-line interface environments, control+C is used to abort the current task and regain user control. It is a special sequence that causes the operating system to send a signal to the active program. Usually the signal causes it to end, but the program may "catch" it and do something else, typically returning control to the user.

In graphical environments 
Larry Tesler created the concept of cut, copy, paste, and undo for human-computer interaction while working at Xerox PARC to control text editing. During the development of the Macintosh it was decided that the cut, paste, copy and undo would be used frequently and assigned them to the ⌘-Z (Undo), ⌘-X (Cut), ⌘-C (Copy), and ⌘-V (Paste). The four letters are all located together at the left end of the bottom row of the standard QWERTY keyboard. IBM and early versions of windows used a different set of keys as part of IBM Common User Access. Later versions of Windows adopted the shortcuts using Control instead of the Command key.

In command-line environments
Control+C was part of various Digital Equipment operating systems, including TOPS-10 and TOPS-20. Its popularity as an abort command was adopted by other systems including Unix. Later systems that copied it include CP/M, DOS and Windows. In POSIX systems, the sequence causes the active program to receive SIGINT, the interruption signal. If the program does not specify how to handle this condition, the program is terminated. Typically a program that does handle a SIGINT will still terminate itself, or at least terminate the task running inside it.

This system is usually preserved even in graphical terminal emulators. If control-C is used for copy in the graphical environment, an ambiguity arises. Typically an alternate keystroke is assigned to one of the commands, and both appear in the emulator's menus.

As many keyboards and computer terminals once directly generated ASCII code, the choice of control+C overlapped with the ASCII end-of-text character. This character has a numerical value of three, as "C" is the third letter of the alphabet. It was chosen to cause an interrupt as it is otherwise unlikely to be part of a program's interactive interface.

See also
C0 and C1 control codes
Control-D
Control-V
Control-X
Control-Z
Control-\
Keyboard shortcut

References

Computer keys